When the School was founded in 1994, it only offered English language courses and diploma programs 
 
SILC employs over 160 faculty and staff. About 3,500 students are currently studying at SILC.

Undergraduate Program
Bachelor of Management (major in Business Administration)
 
Bachelor of Management (major in Information Management & Information System)
 
Bachelor of Economics (major in International Economics & Trade)

Master Program
Master of Finance (MFin) 
 
Master of Engineering Management (MEM)

References

Education in Sydney